Flat Rock Township is one of twelve townships in Bartholomew County, Indiana, United States. As of the 2010 census, its population was 1,574 and it contained 653 housing units.

History
The James Marr House and Farm and Pugh Ford Bridge are listed on the National Register of Historic Places.

Geography

Cities, towns, villages
 Clifford
 Columbus (northeast edge)

Unincorporated towns
 Northcliff
 Nortonburg
 Saint Louis Crossing
(This list is based on USGS data and may include former settlements.)

Adjacent townships
 Washington Township, Shelby County (northeast)
 Haw Creek Township (east)
 Clay Township (southeast)
 Columbus Township (southwest)
 German Township (west)
 Jackson Township, Shelby County (northwest)

Cemeteries
The township contains these four cemeteries: Flat Rock, Liberty, Sidney Branch and Spaugh.

Airports and landing strips
 Columbus Bakalar Municipal Airport

School districts
 Flat Rock-Hawcreek School Corporation

Political districts
 Indiana's 6th congressional district
 Indiana House District 57
 Indiana Senate District 41

References
 United States Census Bureau 2007 TIGER/Line Shapefiles
 United States Board on Geographic Names (GNIS)
 United States National Atlas

External links
 Indiana Township Association
 United Township Association of Indiana

Townships in Bartholomew County, Indiana
Townships in Indiana